Mamie Buazo Ngazale (born 24 December 1988), known as Mamie Buazo, is a DR Congolese footballer who plays as a goalkeeper. She has been a member of the DR Congo women's national team.

Club career
Buazo has played for Grand Hôtel in the Democratic Republic of the Congo.

International career
Buazo was capped for the DR Congo at senior level during the 2006 African Women's Championship.

See also
 List of Democratic Republic of the Congo women's international footballers

References

External links

1988 births
Living people
Footballers from Kinshasa
Democratic Republic of the Congo women's footballers
Women's association football goalkeepers
Democratic Republic of the Congo women's international footballers
21st-century Democratic Republic of the Congo people